The Big Break I was the first round of The Big Break, the Golf Channel's reality television program. The show's premise is to award an aspiring professional golfer exemptions into selected events or full-season exemptions on certain tours. The series debuted on October 6, 2003.

Event
The contest was filmed over ten days at Treetops Resort in Gaylord, Michigan. The winner would receive exemptions into four selected events on the Canadian Tour in 2004 (all of which were broadcast by The Golf Channel).

The ten hopefuls for the first season were Randy Block of San Antonio; Garrett Garland of Northridge, California; Charles Calhoun of Marietta, Ohio; Justin Peters of Plantation, Florida; Steve Duemig of Clearwater, Florida; Anthony Sorentino of Rochester Hills, Michigan; Mark Farnham of Port Jefferson, New York; Craig Pawling of Sunrise, Florida; Jeff Brown of Hampton, Georgia; and Jon Roddy of Orlando, Florida. The show was hosted by Phil Mickelson's former swing coach, Rick Smith, and Katherine Roberts, who was dismissed as eye candy. In the end, Peters defeated Sorentino 3 & 1 in the matchplay final. Peters, though, failed to make the cut in any of the four Canadian Tour events he played in.

Elimination chart

1 The remaining contestants that didn't win immunity, participated in the mulligan challenge.
2 Justin won the final match 3 & 1 over Anthony.

 Green background and WIN means the contestant won matchplay final and The Big Break.
 Blue background and WIN means the contestant won immunity from the elimination challenge.
 Light Blue background and HIGH means the contestant had one of the higher scores  in the elimination challenge.
 White background and IN means the contestant had a good enough score to move onto the next episode during the elimination challenge.
 Orange background and LOW means the contestant had one of the lower scores for the elimination challenge.
 Red background and OUT means the contestant was eliminated from the competition

References

External links
The first season's webpage is still viewable here.

The Big Break
Television shows filmed in Michigan